Andrei Placinta (born November 7, 1974) is a Moldovan sprint canoer who competed in the mid-1990s. He participated at 1996 Summer Olympics in Atlanta and World Championship......

References

External links
Sports-Reference.com profile

1974 births
Living people
Canoeists at the 1996 Summer Olympics
Moldovan male canoeists
Olympic canoeists of Moldova
Place of birth missing (living people)